Heliamphora purpurascens is a species of marsh pitcher plant known only from the summit area of Ptari Tepui in Venezuela, where it grows at elevations of 2400–2500 m.

References

Further reading
  Associazione Italiana Piante Carnivore.
 Fleischmann, A. & S. McPherson (2010). Some ecological notes on Heliamphora (Sarraceniaceae) from Ptari-tepui. Carniflora Australis 7(2): 19–31.
 Nerz, J. & A. Wistuba (June 2006). Heliamphora exappendiculata, a clearly distinct species with unique characteristics. Carnivorous Plant Newsletter 35(2): 43–51. 

purpurascens
Flora of Venezuela
Plants described in 2011
Flora of the Tepuis